Jess Hill is an Australian investigative journalist. In 2020, she won the Stella Prize for her non-fiction work See What You Made Me Do: Power, Control and Domestic Abuse.

Biography 
Hill started her journalism career as a producer for ABC Radio National. In 2011, she relocated to Cairo, Egypt, to become Middle East correspondent for The Global Mail. She then moved into investigative journalism, working for ABC's Background Briefing programme. In 2014 she began writing about domestic violence.

Her book, See What You Made Me Do: Power, Control and Domestic Abuse, was published in 2019 and won the 2020 Stella Prize for Australian women's writing. A three-part documentary series based on the book and presented by Hill, entitled See What You Made Me Do, premiered on SBS Television on 5 May 2021. In 2022, it was announced that Hill would host a second documentary series about consent in Australia titled Asking for It, which will also air on SBS Television and is expected to premiere in 2023.

In 2020, Hill is the inaugural journalist-in-residence at the University of Technology Sydney.

Awards and recognition 

In 2015, Hill received three of the inaugural Our Watch Awards for her reporting on domestic violence, including the Our Watch Gold Award, the Best Series or Special Award (for her series on family violence, broadcast on ABC Radio National) and the Best Longform Award (for Home Truths: The costs and causes of domestic violence, published in The Monthly).

In 2016, Hill received two Walkley Awards — one for Women's Leadership in Media, and one for a piece of feature writing on the Family Court of Australia, Suffer the Children: Trouble in the Family Court. This piece of writing also earned Hill an Amnesty International Australia Media Award.

In addition to winning the Stella Prize, See What You Made Me Do was a finalist for both the 2019 Walkley Book Award and 2019 Australian Human Rights Commission Media Award, and shortlisted for the 2020 Victorian Premier's Literary Award for Non-fiction. It was also shortlisted for the 2020 Davitt Award for best nonfiction crime book.

References

Living people
Year of birth missing (living people)
21st-century Australian journalists
21st-century Australian women writers